Shamlu is a Turkic tribe in Iran.

Shamlu may also refer to:
 Shamlu, East Azerbaijan
 Shamlu-ye Bozorg, East Azerbaijan Province
 Shamlu-ye Kuchak, East Azerbaijan Province
 Shamlu, Fars